Isaac Newton Evans (July 29, 1827 – December 3, 1901) was a Republican member of the U.S. House of Representatives from Pennsylvania.

Biography
Isaac Newton Evans was born near present-day West Chester, Pennsylvania. He attended the common schools and was graduated from the medical department of Bowdoin College in Brunswick, Maine, in 1851 and from Jefferson Medical College in Philadelphia in 1852. He began the practice of medicine in Johnsville, Pennsylvania in 1852. He moved to Hatboro, Pennsylvania in 1856 and continued the practice of medicine. He served as president of the Hatboro National Bank.

Evans was elected as a Republican to the Forty-fifth Congress. He was not a candidate for renomination. He was again elected to the Forty-eighth and Forty-ninth Congresses.

He declined to be a candidate for renomination and returned to the practice of medicine, and was also engaged in the real estate business and banking.  He died in Hatboro in 1901.  He is buried in Friends Cemetery in Horsham, Pennsylvania.

External links

The Political Graveyard

1827 births
1901 deaths
People from Hatboro, Pennsylvania
American people of Welsh descent
Physicians from Pennsylvania
American bankers
Bowdoin College alumni
Thomas Jefferson University alumni
Republican Party members of the United States House of Representatives from Pennsylvania
19th-century American politicians
19th-century American businesspeople